A General Staff is a group of officers, enlisted and civilian staff who serve as the commanding body of a country's armed forces.

Specific General Staff include:
Albanian General Staff
German General Staff
General Staff (Denmark)
General Staff (Sweden)
General Staff (Switzerland)
General Staff of the Israel Defense Forces
General Staff of the Defense Forces of Georgia
General Staff of Armed Forces (Kyrgyzstan)
Polish General Staff
General Staff of the Armed Forces of the Russian Federation
Serbian General Staff
General Staff of the Ukrainian Armed Forces
General Staff of the Turkish Armed Forces
General Staff of the Vietnam People's Army
Imperial General Staff of the United Kingdom

See also
Chief of the General Staff